Astrothelium bullatum is a rare species of corticolous (bark-dwelling) lichen in the family Trypetheliaceae. Found in Bolivia, it was formally described as a new species in 2016 by lichenologists Adam Flakus and André Aptroot. It is only known to occur at the type locality. The lichen has a strongly bullate (convex and swollen) thallus, and it is this feature to which the species epithet bullatum refers.

References

bullatum
Lichen species
Lichens described in 2016
Lichens of Bolivia
Taxa named by André Aptroot
Taxa named by Adam Grzegorz Flakus